Sally Elizabeth Phillips (born 10 May 1970) is an English actress, comedian, and television presenter. She co-created and was one of the writers of the sketch comedy show Smack the Pony. She is also known for her roles in Jam & Jerusalem as Natasha "Tash" Vine, Miranda as Tilly, I'm Alan Partridge as Sophie, Parents as Jenny Pope, Set the Thames on Fire as Colette in 2015, Zapped as Slasher Morgan, and her guest appearances as the fictional Prime Minister of Finland Minna Häkkinen in the US TV series Veep. Phillips also co-starred in Pride and Prejudice and Zombies as Mrs Bennet and in the role of Shazza in all three films of the Bridget Jones franchise.

From 2004 to 2019, Phillips played the title role in the BBC Radio 4 comedy show Clare in the Community. In 2018 she was curator for series 12 of The Museum of Curiosity on BBC Radio 4.

Early life
Phillips was born in Hong Kong, which at the time was under British rule; her father Tim, later chairman of the All England Lawn Tennis and Croquet Club, was an executive with British Airways. In following her father's job, she grew up in the Far East, the Middle East, Italy and Australia. At the age of 13 she was sent to board at Wycombe Abbey School, where she studied for both O-Levels and A-Levels.

She then studied Italian and linguistics at New College, Oxford. Whilst there she joined the Oxford Revue, playing mostly male parts, alongside contemporaries including Stewart Lee and Richard Herring (who went on to have their own television show, Fist of Fun, in which Phillips appeared as "the girl who smells of Spam"). She then co-wrote and performed the one-woman show Benadetta, the Life of a Lesbian Nun in Renaissance Italy, based on a true story. She appeared in the 1990 Oxford Revue THRASH, which also starred Ed Smith.

After graduating with a first class degree, Phillips applied to write a PhD on the Spaghetti Western, but changed her mind and ended up studying drama with the Théâtre de Complicité.

Career 
Phillips performed at nine consecutive Edinburgh Fringe Festivals, appearing in shows including Ra-Ra-Rasputin, Arthur Smith's version of Hamlet (as Ophelia) and Cluub Zarathustra with Simon Munnery, Stewart Lee, Richard Thomas, Julian Barratt and Lori Lixenburg. Her first television role was in Lee and Herring's Fist of Fun in 1994, followed shortly after by a cameo in Alas Smith and Jones with Mel Smith. In 1995, Phillips played the role of a reporter in the unbroadcast pilot of Chris Morris's spoof series Brass Eye, which at that point was called Torque TV, but she did not appear in the series itself. In Six Pairs Of Pants, six actors produced a number of regular sketches, which developed as the series progressed. As well as Phillips, the show featured Jessica Hynes, Simon Pegg, Neil Mullarkey, Katy Carmichael and Simon Schatzberger, and was written in part by Pegg, Hynes, Mullarkey and Phillips. Regular sketches included two New Zealand characters who had moved to the UK and worked behind various bars, the whole group as "Flatmates" and various spoof horror trailers. Phillips had a role as a "Travel Tavern" receptionist in I'm Alan Partridge (1997), and as Laura in Holding the Baby. She played radio DJ Gemma White in the TV series In the Red.  

Phillips had a starring role in the short-lived 1999 British comedy series Hippies with Simon Pegg and Julian Rhind-Tutt, and also co-created and wrote Smack the Pony, a double Emmy Award-winning comedy show, for which she was nominated for best female newcomer at the 1999 British Comedy Awards. Phillips also featured in Eddie Izzard's sitcom Cows.

In 2001, she took the starring role in the David Nicholls series Rescue Me for BBC1. She also played cameo roles in Mean Machine, Birthday Girl and Born Romantic and wrote episodes for the animation Bob and Margaret.

In 2003, she was listed in The Observer as one of the 50 funniest acts in British comedy. She appeared in Bridget Jones's Diary as Shazza, having previously auditioned for Bridget; the character was based upon the film's director, Sharon Maguire.

In 2004, she took the title role in the BBC radio sitcom Clare in the Community which ended after 74 episodes in 2019. In August 2005, she returned to the stage after a long absence, in Oscar Wilde's The Importance of Being Earnest at the Oxford Playhouse. In 2006, she appeared in the Australian comedy feature BoyTown; on television, she appeared as Clare Winchester in the BBC2 science fiction comedy Hyperdrive.

In the second series of Green Wing, Phillips played the character of Holly, whose appearance threatens the blossoming relationship between Mac (Julian Rhind-Tutt) and Caroline (Tamsin Greig). Between 2006 and 2009, she had a recurring role in the BBC's comedy Jam & Jerusalem as Natasha "Tash" Vine, a scatterbrained New Ager.

In 2009, Phillips took the role of Tilly in Miranda as Miranda Hart's character's irritating upper-class friend. The series found critical success and Phillips remained a part of the show throughout its duration, from 2009 to 2015. 

She also had a guest-star part in E4's Skins, series 3 playing Pandora's mother.

In 2009, Phillips won a British Film Council screenwriting competition for her film Fag Mountain. Her first feature film script, The Decoy Bride, started production in spring 2010. Phillips appeared in a supporting role in the film, playing Emma, a Hollywood assistant. The film was released in February 2012, premièring first on cable television and as a digital download, and then had a limited theatrical release.

In December 2010, she appeared in the BBC1 drama Accidental Farmer.

In 2012, she played the lead role in the Sky 1 comedy Parents and also appeared in the CBeebies television series Justin's House. The same year she also appeared with Justin Fletcher in the role of Mr Tumble in Something Special.

She made two episodes of series 3 of the Dave maths and comedy series Dara Ó Briain: School of Hard Sums in 2014, in which she was set various maths-based physical challenges. In America, Phillips has made five appearances in the HBO comedy series Veep as Minna Häkkinen, a fictional Finnish prime minister.

In 2014, she narrated the first series of The Supervet on Channel 4.

During 2015, Phillips appeared in several TV shows, notably House of Fools and Death in Paradise. She has also appeared in the comedy Burn Burn Burn as Ingrid, a main character, and also the TV movie Distinguished Ladies in which she plays the lead role of Bianca.

Phillips appeared in Pride and Prejudice and Zombies (2016) as Mrs Bennet, and as Shazza in Bridget Jones's Baby.

In 2016, she presented the one-off BBC documentary A World Without Down's Syndrome?, which examined the potential impact of non-invasive prenatal testing (NIPT).

In 2017, she competed in series 5 of Taskmaster against Bob Mortimer, Aisling Bea, Nish Kumar and Mark Watson, finishing as runner-up to the eventual winner Mortimer. She appeared in All Star Musicals and Tim Vine Travels in Time in December 2017.

In 2018, she played the scatty new night manager Lou in Trollied. 

In 2020, she played The Gibby in Channel 4's sitcom Friday Night Dinner.

She was the winner of the four competitors who appeared in the special Christmas edition of  The Great British Sewing Bee that was transmitted on New Year's Eve 2020 on BBC 1. Her fellow competitors in the programme were Sabrina Grant, Lesley Joseph and The Vivienne.

Personal life
In 2002, Phillips was hospitalised with salmonellosis during a charity trip to Mexico. She said the illness led to a brain infection which made her body become a "micro-brewery", causing neurological symptoms. Her recovery took months. In March 2022 she appeared on Mel Giedroyc's Unforgivable TV show and discussed a two-year relationship with Richard Herring in her early 20s. 

Phillips is a Christian. She was married to Andrew Bermejo for 14 years and has three sons from their marriage, one with Down's syndrome. In 2017, the couple split.

Phillips is a patron of Blue Apple Theatre (Hampshire, UK) which specialises in creating performance work with adults with a learning disability.

Filmography

Film

Television

Audiobooks

References

External links

1970 births
English film actresses
English stage actresses
English television actresses
English voice actresses
Living people
English women comedians
People educated at Wycombe Abbey
Alumni of New College, Oxford
20th-century English actresses
21st-century English actresses
 English Christians